A pin prick attack is an assault on another person with a needle or syringe tainted with the blood of somebody carrying a blood-borne disease, such as HIV. Although there have been numerous cases of people being attacked with needles and syringes, the idea that people infected with AIDS have deliberately attempted to infect others in this manner is generally considered an urban legend, real cases of infection of HIV in this manner were typically taken from infected victims rather than from infected attackers.

Origins
Although tales of so-called "needle men" or white slavers, who supposedly injected unsuspecting young girls with morphine before carrying them away into a life of prostitution, had been around since the 1930s, the specific case of infection with blood borne diseases might have had its roots in a 1989 incident where ten teenage girls were arrested and later charged with stabbing numerous women with pins in the Upper West Side area of New York City. Coming near the height of the 1980s HIV scares, this led to a great deal of panic amongst the local community although health officials were keen to stress that the chances of anybody contracting the virus in this way were practically zero, and nobody affected in the attacks subsequently tested positive for HIV.

As an email/Internet scare story
The rise of the Internet in the 1990s led to the rise of numerous urban legends concerning the pin prick attack, which could be quickly spread via email and discussion forums and which soon assumed a standardized form. The email would take the form of a warning to others that a young person had been visiting a cinema or a night club when the person felt a slight prick on his or her arm. Not taking any notice, the person would carry on with his or her leisure activity, and it was only later that the person would find stuck to his or her clothes or in his or her pocket a badge or sticker carrying the slogan "welcome to the AIDS club", followed a few months later with a positive HIV test. These rumors bear similarities to the so-called AIDS Mary legends of the 1980s, whereby a man would enjoy a one-night stand with a stranger at his house and awaken the next morning to find the stranger gone and the words "Welcome to the AIDS Club" written in red lipstick on his bathroom mirror. However, the American Center for Disease Control has stressed on numerous occasions that it has yet to confirm a single case of HIV as being transmitted in this fashion and has dismissed such emails as a hoax. The motive behind such emails appears to be little more than a scare story intended to frighten the recipient into staying away from leisure establishments by playing on the public fear of AIDS and the notion that an individual could be infected with a killer disease via a random, malicious attack.

Documented examples
In 1933, a pin prick attack led to the death of Indian man Amarendra Pandey from plague.

A pin prick attack leading to the deliberate transmission of HIV occurred at the Long Bay Jail in Sydney on July 22, 1990, when prison officer Geoffrey Pearce was attacked by HIV-infected prisoner Graham Farlow, who stabbed him with a syringe full of his own infected blood. Despite immediate medical attention and the "one in 200" chance of being infected, Pearce tested positive for the disease a few months later, and died of an AIDS related illness in 1997 at age 28.

In 1992, Brryan Jackson was injected with a syringe of HIV-infected blood by his father. Jackson was diagnosed with AIDS that same year.

In 1998, Richard J. Schmidt, a physician in Lafayette, Louisiana, was convicted of attempted murder after injecting a former lover, Janice Trahan, with HIV and Hepatitis C-tainted blood, claiming to be giving her a vitamin shot. Trahan developed both Hep-C and HIV as a result.

See also
 Criminal transmission of HIV
 Needle spiking
 Needlestick injury

References

External links
 http://www.snopes.com/horrors/madmen/pinprick.asp

Urban legends
HIV/AIDS
Crime